Göran Persson served as Prime Minister of Sweden between 22 March 1996 and 6 October 2006.  Persson took over after Ingvar Carlsson, who retired as party leader and Prime Minister.  Following the 2006 general election, he and the Persson Cabinet lost power to a centre-right coalition government.

History 

When Ingvar Carlsson in the fall of 1995 declared that he intended to resign as leader for the Social Democratic Party and prime minister of Sweden, deputy prime minister Mona Sahlin was the only one who accepted to run for that position. However, a scandal mainly concerning irresponsible use of her Riksdag credit card and unpaid parking tickets forced her to withdraw her candidacy that same fall. The search continued and Jan Nyman, Ingela Thalén as well as Göran Persson became the new possible candidates, but all of them declined to run when approached by the election board.

After repeatedly declining to candidate Göran Persson suddenly changed his mind, accepted and was elected new leader of the Social Democratic Party and prime minister of Sweden in March 1996. Göran Persson inherited a party with a solid representation in the parliament, in the 1994 election more than 45 percent of the voters had given his predecessor their vote. Still not leading a party with a majority of the seats in the parliament, Göran Persson relied on parliamentary support from the Centre Party when outlining his politics. He launched a series of criticized cut-back programs, defending them in a famous speech to the parliament starting with the expression "One who is in debt is not free".

He did not manage to convince the voters however and the 1998 general election became a huge setback for the Social Democratic Party, now supported by only 36,4 percent of the voters. The Moderate party leader, Carl Bildt, expressed his concerns about Göran Persson not resigning from office, as an outcome of the election. Bildt claimed that the government forming process should start all over with the Speaker of parliament selecting a prime minister based on his or her ability to form a government. He initiated a vote of no confidence, opposed by a majority formed by the Social Democratic Party as well as the Green and Left parties which were to be the new political partners. Eventually Göran Persson formed a one-party government, refusing to give seats to the Left or Green parties.

In the 2002 general election Persson gained an increase in voter support with 39,9 percent voting for his party, again the Moderate Party leader, this time Bo Lundgren, initiated a vote of no confidence targeting the whereabouts of the actual parliamentary support for Persson. This time Persson was not backed by the Green Party, received support from a minority but managed to stay in office since the Green Party refrained from voting at all. He continued his one-party government policy, but extended his co-operation with the Green and Left parties for another four-year term.

Cabinet ministers 
|}

Policies of the Cabinet

Controversies and public perception

Suspected ballot rigging
After the 2002 elections, electoral workers in the Stockholm area expressed concerns about how Social Democratic campaign workers had collected large numbers of voting cards from voters and voted on their behalf. To collect large quantities of voting cards and vote in such a way is unconstitutional and therefore gained some initial media attention. The county and city of Stockholm, governed by a coalition led by the Moderate Party, became subject to change of leadership as a result of the election and the criticism was quickly silenced. The circumstances of the suspected ballot rigging was never investigated. There have been other cases that have led to evictions at 2002 elections for ballot rigging by Social democratic party members working in the election offices. Many reports of other ballot rigging have also been announced throughout the country by other parties but in lack of proof none has gone to court.

Handling of the tsunami disaster
During 2005 a scandal erupted as a result of widespread discontent with the lack of government aid to Swedes who fell victims to the notorious tsunami disaster, killing hundreds of Swedish tourists in December 2004. The criticism emerged early since the government refused to give clearance to prepared Swedish military rescue planes to aid in the rescue efforts in Asia. The planes were left stranded on Swedish airfields and Swedish tourists, in many cases severely injured, had to wait for the few crowded regular flights that were available back home to Sweden. A committee initiated an investigation in 2005 to shed some light on what really happened during the Christmas of 2004 and if anyone ever had noticed the early reports from the Swedish military intelligence offices. The scandal escalated into a case for the Swedish standing committee of constitution inqueries (constitutional court) as it became evident that Swedish government officials either lied or refused to answer properly to the questions asked by the investigators. In early 2006 the scandal reached its climax as top ministers, including the prime minister, were interrogated under trial-like circumstances broadcast live on Swedish television. There has also been suspicious deletion of communication traffic registers and e-mails regarding the time of this event. A directive was changed to delete this kind of data after a shorter time and after it had been done the directive was once again revised to its original writing. After the election and a new cabinet come to be in power. Backup tapes of the deleted information has now been found stored in a vault in the cellar.

Persson accused of threatening TV4
During the live broadcast interrogations the CEO of the largest privately held Swedish TV-channel, Jan Scherman, claimed that Prime Minister Göran Persson threatened him during the election campaign in 2002. According to Mr. Scherman, Persson said that "TV4 is investing heavy in a non-socialistic election victory", if the socialists wins you "will have a lots of enemies in Rosenbad". The claims never gained as much public interest as did the other scandals, even though the accusations enhanced the image of Mr. Persson trying to gain control of the major free media companies. In Sweden, the Swedish Television, SVT, with the other two large TV-channels, SVT1 and SVT2, is connected to the government and Social Democrats hold key positions among the board of directors. Björn Rosengren, Social Democrat, former Minister of Enterprise and close friend of Göran Persson, has rapidly gained an influential position in the Swedish media company MTG which in turn owns TV-channels and newspapers such as Metro International.

Defamation campaign in 2006
In 2006 an extensive e-mail based defamation campaign primarily targeting the family of Swedish leading opposition politician Fredrik Reinfeldt was revealed in Swedish media. The content of the letters written were rumours about irregularities or illegal actions claimed to have been performed by Fredrik Reinfeldt himself or his close relatives. According to computer specialists the source of the campaign had been tracked down to computers located at the Social Democratic HQ in central Stockholm. Initially spokespersons of the Social Democratic Party denied all involvement in the defamation but were later forced to confess that one of their employees had written the letters as evidence became overwhelming. The case was reported to the police by the Moderate Party but was closed a few days later since it was considered a private law-issue.

The Pirate Bay affair
The raid of 31 May 2006 on The Pirate Bay ISP PRQ is thought to be a direct result of the justice minister Thomas Bodström. As a result, he is now the subject of an investigation by the Constitutional Committee. This type of 'interference' in the functioning of independent authorities such as the police, called 'ministerstyre', is by Swedish law prohibited. Media requested to see e-mails that could be relevant to the matter but the 700 of the 900 e-mails requested were denied on the basis that they were top secret declaration. Previously, the government said that the matter would be open for public review. When it was asked why the e-mails had been declared top secret Thomas Bodström said that they were covered by the secrecy declaration which is determined by the government.

Minister of foreign affairs resigns
In the aftermaths of criticism following on the tsunami disaster, the harshly criticised Swedish minister of foreign affairs, Laila Freivalds, managed to maintain her office. However, in 2006 another embarrassing scandal erupted with its roots in Denmark where paintings of the Muslim prophet Muhammed were published during the fall of 2005. A Swedish right-wing political newspaper decided to publish them as well on the Internet edition of their publication, the webpage however was quickly closed down by the ISP after intervention from the Swedish Security Service and the Swedish office of foreign affairs. The close down became subject to much debate and some journalists compared it to the censorship of anti-German articles during WWII. Mrs. Freivalds denied at first all involvement in the case, but was forced to confess as official reports clearly pointed out her central role in the closing of the webpage. The political pressure became too much and Prime Minister Göran Persson, flanked by Mrs. Freivalds herself, chose to briefly declare the resignation of his minister of foreign affairs under a short press conference. That Freivalds did not declare the expected news herself, despite the fact that she was obviously present on the press conference, quickly spurred discussions about whether she resigned voluntarily or actually got dismissed by the prime minister.

References

External links
The Government and the Government Offices of Sweden
Statement of Government Policy (6 October 2006)

1996 establishments in Sweden
2006 disestablishments in Sweden
Persson, Goran
Politics of Sweden
1990s in Sweden
2000s in Sweden
Cabinets established in 1996
Cabinets disestablished in 2006